Firebrand Games Limited is a British video game developer based in Glasgow, Scotland. The company was founded by chief executive officer Mark Greenshields in 2006 and has operated a second office in Merritt Island, Florida, since September 2007.

History 
Firebrand Games was founded by Mark Greenshields in 2006, after his previous venture, DC Studios, closed its operations in the United Kingdom earlier that year. He became the new company's chief executive officer. In September 2007, the company announced the opening a second office in Merritt Island, Florida. This office replaced DC Studios' only remaining studio, which was based in Montreal. In September 2009, Firebrand Games' headquarters were moved into new, larger office spaces within Glasgow. By August 2010, primarily due to the cost of doing business in Scotland, the Meritt Island office had grown larger in headcount than the Glasgow headquarters.

Firebrand Games has primarily worked on Nintendo DS versions of third-party intellectual properties in the racing genre, including TrackMania and Need for Speed. Several of these use the in-house game engine titled 3D Octane. In May 2011, the company stated its desire to develop a game in the F-Zero franchise. Firebrand Games announced its first original intellectual property, the puzzle game Solar Flux, in July 2013.

Games developed

References

External links 
 

2006 establishments in Scotland
British companies established in 2006
Companies based in Glasgow
Video game companies established in 2006
Video game companies of the United Kingdom
Video game development companies